Stade Zéralda is a multi-purpose stadium in Zéralda, Algeria. The stadium was used as one of the two venues for the 2009 African U-17 Championship. The stadium can hold up to 3000 people.

References

Buildings and structures in Algiers Province
Football venues in Algeria